James Greig Arthur  (born May 18, 1944) is a Canadian mathematician working on automorphic forms, and former President of the American Mathematical Society. He is a Mossman Chair and University Professor at the University of Toronto Department of Mathematics.

Education and career
Born in Hamilton, Ontario, Arthur graduated from Upper Canada College in 1962, received a BSc from the University of Toronto in 1966, and a MSc from the same institution in 1967. He received his PhD from Yale University in 1970. He was 
a student of Robert Langlands; his dissertation was Analysis of Tempered Distributions on Semisimple Lie Groups of Real Rank One.

Arthur taught at Yale from 1970 until 1976. He joined the faculty of Duke University in 1976. He has been a professor at the University of Toronto since 1978. He was four times a visiting scholar at the Institute for Advanced Study between 1976 and 2002.

Contributions
Arthur is known for the Arthur–Selberg trace formula, generalizing the Selberg trace formula from the rank-one case (due to Selberg himself) to general reductive groups, one of the most important tools for research on the Langlands program. He also introduced the Arthur conjectures.

Recognition
Arthur was elected a Fellow of the Royal Society of Canada in 1981 and a Fellow of the Royal Society in 1992. In 1998 he was an Invited Speaker of the International Congress of Mathematicians in Berlin. He was elected a Foreign Honorary Member of the American Academy of Arts and Sciences in 2003. In 2012 he became a fellow of the American Mathematical Society.
He was elected as a fellow of the Canadian Mathematical Society in 2019.

References

Further reading

External links

Works of James Arthur at the Clay institute
Archive of Collected Works of James Arthur at the University of Toronto Department of Mathematics
 Wolf Prizes 2015
 Author profile in the database zbMATH

Living people
1944 births
20th-century Canadian mathematicians
Companions of the Order of Canada
Duke University faculty
Fellows of the American Academy of Arts and Sciences
Fellows of the American Mathematical Society
Fellows of the Canadian Mathematical Society
Canadian Fellows of the Royal Society
Fellows of the Royal Society of Canada
Foreign associates of the National Academy of Sciences
Institute for Advanced Study visiting scholars
People from Hamilton, Ontario
Presidents of the American Mathematical Society
University of Toronto alumni
Academic staff of the University of Toronto
Yale Graduate School of Arts and Sciences alumni
Yale University faculty
21st-century Canadian mathematicians